Alupotawela is a village in Sri Lanka. It is a hamlet of Kaduwela, within Matale District, Central Province.

History
As of 1896, the inhabitants were "Tellas and Stone-cutters", and were masons to the King during the Kandyan period. A canal was cut was from Yatawara to Alupotawela during the reign of King Vijayapala of Matale.

Demographics

See also
List of towns in Central Province, Sri Lanka

References

External links

Populated places in Matale District